Rick Roth (born November 21, 1952) is a Republican member of the Florida Legislature representing the state's 85th House district, which includes part of Palm Beach County.

Florida House of Representatives
Roth defeated Andrew Watt in the August 30, 2016 Republican primary, winning 62% of the vote. In the November 8, 2016 general election, Roth won 57.7% of the vote, defeating Democrat Robert Simeone.

Roth was reelected in 2018, defeating Democrat Ellen Baker with 54.61% of the vote in the November 6, 2018 general election.

References

Republican Party members of the Florida House of Representatives
Living people
21st-century American politicians
Emory University alumni
1952 births